Chhalesar is a village in the block and nagar panchayat of Jawan Sikandarpur, Aligarh district in Northern India. It is also known for being the location of the fourth Vedic school ("gurukul") founded in 1870 by the Arya Samaj reform movement. Swami Dayanand also visited here with Thakur Bopal Singh and Thakur Manna Singh.

References

See also
Kasimpur Power House
Talib Nagar

Villages in Aligarh district